This is a list of the mayors of the city of Belo Horizonte, Brazil.

Mayors

See also
 Belo Horizonte history
 Belo Horizonte history (in Portuguese)
 List of mayors of largest cities in Brazil (in Portuguese)
 List of mayors of capitals of Brazil (in Portuguese)

Local government in Brazil
Belo Horizonte
Belo Horizonte